Niphona parallela is a species of beetle in the family Cerambycidae. It was described by White in 1858. It is known from India, China, Myanmar, Cambodia, Malaysia, and Vietnam.

References

parallela
Beetles described in 1858